John (II) La Touche (April 1775 – 30 January 1820) was an Irish Whig politician.

He was the son of John (I) La Touche (1732-1810), who had represented Newcastle, Newtownards, Harristown and Kildare in the Parliament of Ireland and subsequently sat for Kildare from 1801 to 1802 in the new Parliament of the United Kingdom.
 
John La Touche junior represented Newtownards in the Irish House of Commons from 1796 to 1797. Elected in 1798 for both Newcastle and Harristown he chose to sit for Harristown until the Act of Union in 1800/01.

He then represented Dublin City 1802-1806 and Leitrim 1807-1820 
. In the UK General Election of 1802 La Touche defeated Tory MP the Right Honourable George Ogle. He was himself defeated in the UK General Election of 1806.

He was appointed Sheriff of Leitrim for 1808–09.

References

Parliamentary Election Results in Ireland, 1801-1922, edited by B.M. Walker (Royal Irish Academy 1978)
The Parliaments of England by Henry Stooks Smith (1st edition published in three volumes 1844–50), 2nd edition edited (in one volume) by F.W.S. Craig (Political Reference Publications 1973)

 	
	
	
	

 	
 	
 	

1775 births
1820 deaths
Irish MPs 1790–1797
Irish MPs 1798–1800
Members of the Parliament of the United Kingdom for County Dublin constituencies (1801–1922)
Members of the Parliament of the United Kingdom for County Leitrim constituencies (1801–1922)
UK MPs 1802–1806
UK MPs 1807–1812
UK MPs 1812–1818
UK MPs 1818–1820
Whig (British political party) MPs for Irish constituencies
High Sheriffs of Leitrim
Members of the Parliament of Ireland (pre-1801) for County Down constituencies
Members of the Parliament of Ireland (pre-1801) for County Kildare constituencies